William Drew Washburn Jr. (April 3, 1863 – October 10, 1929) was an American politician and businessman.

Early life and education 
Born in Saint Paul, Minnesota, Washburn attended Minneapolis Public Schools and graduated from Phillips Andover Academy in 1883. In 1888, Washburn graduated from Yale University.

Career 
Washburn was in the newspaper, real estate, and railroad business. He served in the Minnesota House of Representatives from 1901 to 1903, 1905–1907, 1909 to 1913, 1917 to 1919, and 1921 to 1926. Washburn was a Republican.

Personal life 
Washburn is a member of the political Washburn family. His father, William D. Washburn, served in the United States Congress and Minnesota Legislature.

References

1863 births
1929 deaths
Politicians from Saint Paul, Minnesota
Phillips Academy alumni
Yale University alumni
Businesspeople from Saint Paul, Minnesota
Republican Party members of the Minnesota House of Representatives
Washburn family